Narpatganj is a Community development block of Araria district, in Bihar state of India. It is one out of 3 blocks of Forbesganj subdivision. The headquarter of the block is at Narpatganj town.

The block is divided into many Village Councils and villages.

Geography
Narpatganj is one of the 9 blocks in Araria district.

Demographics

Population
The total population of the block is 270,128. There are 64 villages and 0 towns in this block. The literacy rate is 34.71%. The female literacy rate is 20.56%. The male literacy rate is 47.22%.

Administration and politics
Narpatganj (Vidhan Sabha constituency) is the assembly constituency for the block. Jai Prakash Yadav (BJP) elected in 2020 is the MLA.

Gram Panchayats
There are many gram panchayats of Narpatganj block in Forbesganj subdivision, Araria district.

village list 

 Ajitnagar
 Amrori
 Anchraand Hanuman nagar
 Baghua Dibiganj
 Bardaha
 Barhara
 Barhepara
 Bariarpur
 Barmotra Arazi
 Basmatiya
 Bela
 Belsandi
 Belwa
 Bhadwar
 Bhairoganj
 Bhanghi
 Bhawanipur
 Bhorhar
 Chakorwa
 Dahrahra
 Damiya
 Dargahiganj
 Dombana
 Dumari
 Fatehpur
 Gadhgawan
 Garuha Bishunpur
 Ghurna
 Goarpuchhri
 GokhulPur
 Hanumannagar
 Jitwarpur
 Kamat Pathraha
 Kandhaili
 Khaira
 Khapdeh
 Kochgaon
 Koskapur
 Kuchgaon
 Lachhmipur
 Madhubani
 Madhura
 Maheshpatti
 Manikpur
 Mirdaul
 Nathpur
 Nawabganj
 Parasi
 Patehpur Arazi
 Pathraha
 Pathraha
 Pharhi
 Pithaura
 Pokharia
 Posdaha
 Rajganj
 Ramghat
 Rewahi
 Sahabganj
 Sawaldeh
 Shyamnagar
 Sonapur
 Tamganj
 Tamganj Toufir
 Tope Nawabganj

See also
Administration in Bihar

References

Community development blocks in Araria district